{{Infobox television
| image                = GMM_S21_10_Years.jpeg
| image_alt            = 
| caption              = Good Mythical Morning Season 21-Present Title Card
| alt_name             = GMM
| genre                = ComedyTalk showVariety
| creator              = Rhett McLaughlinLink Neal
| developer            = 
| writer               = Brittany Van Horne (head writer)Matt Carney (head writer)Aubrey Schopinsky (senior writer)Davanté SandersEmily FlemingMeghan Malone
| director             = Morgan Locke
| creative_director    = 
| presenter            = Rhett & Link
| starring             = Rhett McLaughlinLink Neal
| judges               = 
| voices               = 
| narrated             = 
| theme_music_composer = Royalty free music (2012–2014)Pomplamoose (2014–2017, 2022-present)Jeff Zeigler and Sarah Schimeneck (2017–2018)Mark Byers (2019–2021)
| opentheme            = 
| endtheme             = 
| composer             = 
| country              = United States
| language             = English
| num_seasons          = 23 (Regular)5 (Good Mythical Summer)28 (Total)
| num_episodes         = 2334 
| list_episodes        = List of Good Mythical Morning episodes
| executive_producer   = Rhett McLaughlinLink NealStevie Wynne LevineMatt Carney
| producer             = Chase HiltDavin TjenChris FancherSilaine SkeeleJosh Scherer (culinary)Nicole Enayati (culinary)
| cinematography       = Benjamin Eck
| editor               = Layne WattsMorgan LockeKathryn HitchanTaylor Dolniak
| camera               = Multiple camera
| runtime              = 8–25 minutes
| company              = Mythical
| distributor          = Mythical
| picture_format       = 
| audio_format         = 
| first_aired          = 
| last_aired           = present
| preceded_by          = 
| followed_by          = 
| related              = Good Mythical MoreMythical KitchenThe Mythical ShowLet's Talk About ThatEar BiscuitsSong BiscuitsGood Mythical Evening| network              = YouTube
}}Good Mythical Morning (abbreviated as GMM) is an American comedy, talk and variety YouTube series created by Rhett McLaughlin and Link Neal. The show first aired on YouTube on January 9, 2012, and continues to be uploaded every weekday during the seasons. As of January 2023, the show has twenty-three regular seasons and five summer seasons, one being part of season 11 and four being standalone seasons. The YouTube channel has over 18.1 million subscribers and more than 8.5 billion total video views.

The show has featured many celebrities and Internet personalities as guests, including Daniel Radcliffe, PewDiePie, Post Malone, Kobe Bryant, Bill Hader, Linkin Park, Terry Crews, and Alton Brown.

 History and premise 
On January 3, 2011, Rhett and Link aired the first episode of Good Morning Chia Lincoln, a daily show similar in theme and format. The show was retired on February 28, after 40 episodes.

Rhett and Link aired the first episode of Good Mythical Morning approximately one year later on January 9, 2012, to their YouTube channel of the same name. The series' crew only consisted of one member during the first season, but has since grown to have twenty-eight members, as a part of Mythical Entertainment. Fan reactions to their behind-the-scenes crew led to the creation of the YouTube channel "Mythical", which focuses on the antics of their crew and other skits. The show focuses on Rhett and Link as they tell stories, sing songs, do challenges, and more. On November 6, 2017, Good Mythical Morning became a YouTube Original series. Shortly after, they reverted to their classic format.

 Format Good Mythical Morning is uploaded to YouTube every weekday morning, at approximately 6:00 AM Eastern Time. Each episode consists of Rhett and Link playing a game with varying formats, often featuring taste tests.

During the twelfth season of GMM, the show released four episodes per day. The change was met with backlash from longtime viewers of the show. This format persisted until the fourteenth season, when they returned to making one episode of GMM per day, followed by an episode of Good Mythical More.

At the end of every episode, Rhett and Link spin the "Wheel of Mythicality", which can land on categories such as "6 Degrees of Bacon," "Winface," and "Gifticality". The contents of the wheel often change between seasons. The consequences of each wheel spin are determined in Good Mythical More, a more relaxed after-show.

Due to the circumstances of the COVID-19 pandemic, beginning on March 30, 2020, Good Mythical Morning adopted a modified format in which episodes consist of a mix between prerecorded studio episodes and episodes featuring Rhett and Link broadcasting over video call from their own homes. This format continued until June 1, 2020, when the release schedule returned to normal, and the show was once again recorded in the studio.

 Let's Talk About That Let's Talk About That was a Saturday show that aired at 6:00 AM ET hosted by Stevie Wynne Levine. Before LTAT, they had a few other Friday morning shows, including Ear Biscuits (which is still airing), and Good Mythical Crew, continuing.LTAT was a discussion of the main show's episodes that week (hence the slogan, "the show about the show"). The show began with a "rejected GMM food", which was usually food that was not selected for a video that week for various reasons but was saved for Rhett, Link, and Stevie to try during LTAT. Chef Josh often appeared to describe the food. The show originally began with the "beverage of the week", where they drank an odd beverage and talked about how it tasted and then used a segue to transition to the LTAT's main topic.LTAT was discontinued on December 21, 2019, having completed 54 episodes across two seasons. As a replacement, Rhett & Link began recording vlogs on their original main channel.

The phrase LTAT came from Good Mythical Morning when they would say or ask a question in the intro, then follow it with "Let's talk about that!"

 Good Mythical Evening 
On October 28, 2021, McLaughlin and Neal hosted a one-night-only special show titled Good Mythical Evening which was live-streamed to the Looped video-sharing platform behind a pay-wall. The special was described as "an evening of LIVE R-rated Mythicality as they take classic Good Mythical Morning favorites and add a little cursing, alcohol, sex, and whatever else is on YouTube's list of "don'ts."

Due to positive response, a second Good Mythical Evening was announced July 11, 2022. Tickets went on sale for Mythical Society members on July 13, 2022, and later for the rest of the public on July 15, 2022. The event was live-streamed this time through the Moment House platform which was initially scheduled for September 1, 2022. However, during the countdown concluding the pre-show, Moment House servers crashed due to high traffic volume. Both Mythical and Moment House issued apologies and statements which resulted in the live-stream being rescheduled for September 9, 2022, along with a new pre-show, as well as all existing ticket holders having access to the rescheduled event.

 Episodes

The third season of Good Mythical Morning introduced the "Taste Test" series which include episodes where the hosts guess the food in blindfolds, challenge themselves to eat something often spicy and disgusting, and compare a particular type of food across different brands. Some of the most popular videos from this series are the "Bug War Challenge", the "Ghost Pepper Challenge", the "Carolina Reaper Challenge" and the "Sriracha Challenge". The fifth season brought the "Will It" series, in which the hosts try and invent different varieties of a famous type of food with unusual and increasingly disgusting ingredients. The first episode of "Will It" was aired on May 5, 2014, on Cinco De Mayo titled "Will it Taco" where Rhett and Link tried tacos made of pine needles, baby shampoo, and congealed pork blood. The most viewed video on their channel is "Amazing Game Show Cheaters" with over 31 million views. It was episode 62 of season 9.

The show has featured many celebrities and Internet personalities as guests, including:

Skylar Astin
Bobby Berk
Jack Black
Alton Brown
Kobe Bryant
Terry Crews
Megan Fox
Joseph Garrett
Steve-O
Kat Graham
Hank Green
Bill Hader
Jacksepticeye
Larry King
Zach King
Gavin Leatherwood
Linkin Park
Markiplier
PewDiePie
Post Malone
Coyote Peterson
Daniel Radcliffe
Andrew Rea
Iliza Shlesinger
Kevin Smith
Smosh
Ian Somerhalder
Michael Stevens
Bella Thorne
Rainn Wilson
Ross Butler (actor)
Rob Corddry
Erinn Hayes
Ben Schwartz
Joe Manganiello
Cameron Monaghan
Myth (gamer)
Lilly Singh
Kelly Rowland
Sasha Banks
Collins Key and Devan Key
Alfonso Ribeiro
Jameela Jamil
Nick Kroll
Abbi Jacobson
June Diane Raphael
Elle Mills
Macaulay Culkin
Gigi Gorgeous
Karamo Brown
Janel Parrish
Eva Gutowski
Emma Chamberlain
Lake Bell
Zachary Levi
Becky Lynch
Jackson Wang
Jenny Slate
Nina Dobrev
Shay Mitchell
Dave Franco
Justin Long
Seth Green
D'Arcy Carden

 Reception 
The show has become very popular on YouTube, with the Good Mythical Morning channel having more than 17 million subscribers and over 8 billion video views as of November 2022. Each episode generally gains over 1 million views. The show has also won Best Variety Series at the International Academy of Web Television Awards, Best Web Series at the Shorty Awards, Best Comedy Series and Best Non-Fiction Channel, Series or Show at the Streamy Awards, among many others. The series was also featured in The Tonight Show Starring Jimmy Fallon with episodes of "Will It Tea," "Will It S'more," "Will It Hot Dog," and "Will It Hummus?"

While the fan response to the series has been mostly positive, the relaunched format starting November 6, 2017, was met with a negative reaction from many fans. Several viewers criticized the new format, targeting the show for losing its charm, focusing on guest stars, and feeling forced and rushed. Many fans also reacted negatively to the decision to split each episode into four parts. While the show addressed these complaints in a video response, the number of views for newer episodes steadily declined in the following weeks, with only a handful of episodes surpassing one million views. Despite this, the show currently has retained over fifteen million subscribers to their YouTube channel. In July 2018, the show reverted to the older format, and complaints by fans became much less pronounced. The show once again regularly surpasses a million views per episode.Good Mythical Morning won Show of the Year at the 9th Streamy Awards in 2019 and again at the 12th Streamy Awards in 2022.

See also
 Rhett and Link's Buddy System''

References

External links 
 Official website
 
Good Mythical Morning  Channel Website

2010s YouTube series
Viral videos
2012 web series debuts
YouTube channels launched in 2008
American Internet celebrities
American comedy
YouTube channels
American comedy web series
Streamy Award-winning channels, series or shows
2020s YouTube series